This is a list of Jäger units in various national armies. Jäger, or Jaeger, is the German word for "hunter", and describes a kind of light infantry.

In English the word Jaeger is also translated as "rifleman" or "ranger".

German-speaking nations' armies

Austria 
 Jagdkommando
 Kaiserjäger

Germany feudal/imperial era

Prussian / imperial 
Royal Prussian Guard Jägerbattalion
Royal Prussian Guard Schützenbattalion
Royal Prussian Jägerbattalion Count York von Wartenburg (East Prussian) No.1
Royal Prussian Jägerbattalion Prince Bismarck (Pomeranian) No.2
Royal Prussian Brandenburg Jägerbattalion No.3
Royal Prussian Magdeburg Jägerbattalion No.4
Royal Prussian Jägerbattalion von Neumann (1st Silesian) No.5
Royal Prussian 2nd Silesian Jägerbattalion No.6
Royal Prussian Westphalian Jägerbattalion No.7
Royal Prussian Rhineland (or Rhenish) Jägerbattalion No.8
Royal Prussian Lauenburg Jägerbattalion No.9
Royal Prussian Hanoverian Jägerbattalion No.10
Royal Prussian Electoral Hessian Jägerbattalion No.11

Other German kingdoms and principalities 
 Kingdom of Bavaria
Royal Bavarian 1st Jägerbattalion
Royal Bavarian 2nd Jägerbattalion

 Kingdom of Saxony
Royal Saxon Jägerbattalion No.12
Royal Saxon Jägerbattalion No.13

 Grand Duchy of Mecklenburg-Schwerin
Grand-Ducal Mecklenburg(-Schwerin) Jägerbattalion No.14

Germany (First World War)
1914
Guard Reserve Jägerbattalion
Guard Reserve Schützenbattalion
Reserve Jägerbattalions 1-14
Bavarian Reserve Jägerbattalions 1-2
Bavarian Ski Battalions 1-2

1915
Reserve Jägerbattalions 15-26
Royal Prussian 27th Jäger Battalion (Finnish Volunteers)
Bavarian Ski Battalions 3-4
Württemberg Ski Company (later renamed the Württemberg Mountain Company and expanded to a Battalion, then a Regiment)
Bavarian Jägerregiment No.1 (1st and 2nd Bavarian Jäger Battalions, 2nd Bavarian Reserve Jäger Battalion)
Jägerregiment No.2 (10th Jäger Battalion, 10th and 14th Reserve Jäger Battalions)
Bavarian Jägerregiment No.3 (1st - 4th Bavarian Ski Battalions)
Alpine Corps (1st, 2nd & 3rd Jäger Regiments)

1916
Württemberg Mountain Battalion
Jägerregiment No.4 (11th Jäger Battalion, 5th and 6th Reserve Jäger Battalions)
Jägerregiment No.5 (17th, 18th and 23rd Reserve Jäger Battalions)
Jägerregiment No.6 (5th, 6th and 14th Jäger Battalions)
Jägerregiment No.7 (13th Jäger Battalion, 25th and 26th Reserve Jäger Battalions)
Jägerregiment No.8 (4th, 16th and 24th Reserve Jäger Battalions)
Jägerregiment No.9 (8th Jäger Battalion, 12th Reserve Jäger Battalion)
Jägerregiment No.10 (12th Jäger Battalion, 13th Reserve Jäger Battalion)

1917
Royal Bavarian 29th Infantry Regiment (Jager Regiment) (1st Bavarian Reserve Jagerbattalion, 7th and 9th Reserve Jägerbattalions)
German Jäger Division (11th, 12th & 13th Jägerregiments)

1918
Württemberg Mountain Regiment
Jägerregiment No.11 (Guard Reserve Jägerbattalion, Guard Reserve Schützenbattalion, 1st Jägerbattalion)
Jägerregiment No.12 (2nd and 7th Jägerbattalions, 1st Reserve Jägerbattalion)
Jägerregiment No.13 (8th, 20th and 21st Reserve Jägerbattalions)
Jägerregiment No.14 (15th, 19th and 22nd Reserve Jägerbattalions)
Bavarian Reserve Jägerregiment No.15 (1st Bavarian Reserve Jagerbattalion and Caucasian Railway Protection Battalion)

Germany (Third Reich)

Jäger units
5th Jäger Division
8th Jäger Division
28th Jäger Division
42nd Jäger Division
97th Jäger Division
100th Jäger Division
101st Jäger Division
104th Jäger Division
114th Jäger Division
117th Jäger Division
118th Jäger Division
Jäger-Division Alpen

Special-purpose units
1st Ski Division
24th Waffen Mountain Division of the SS Karstjäger, Waffen-SS mountain troops from the Austrian Karst
10th Cyclist Jäger Brigade

Other Jäger variants
Fallschirmjäger (paratroopers)
Feldjäger (military police)
Gebirgsjäger (mountain infantry)
Panzerjäger (anti-tank troops)

Germany (Federal Republic)
Jäger Regiment 1, an air-mobile infantry unit that was downsized to battalion level
Jägerbataillon 91, a unit that was formed in 2015
Gebirgsjägerbrigade 23, Mountain Infantry Brigage 23
Gebirgsjägerbataillion 231
Gebirgsjägerbataillion 232
Gebirgsjägerbataillion 233
Fallschirmjägerregiment 26, formed in 2015 from parts of Fallschirmjägerbataillon 261 and Fallschirmjägerbataillon 263
Fallschirmjägerregiment 31, formed in 2015 from Bataillonelements of Airborne Brigade 31

Other national army equivalents

Belgium
 Chasseurs Ardennais ('Arddennes Hunters'), armoured infantry battalion
 1st Regiment Jagers te Paard, mechanized reconnaissance battalion
 2/4th Regiment Chasseurs à Cheval, mechanized reconnaissance battalion with electronic warfare unit

Denmark
 Jaeger Corps, a special forces unit of the Danish Special Operations Command, formerly of the Royal Danish Army

Finland
Jäger Movement, volunteers from Finland in Germany trained as jägers
Guard Jaeger Regiment, a Finnish Army unit
Jaeger Brigade, a unit of the Finnish Army
Utti Jaeger Regiment, a Finnish Army training and development centre for special forces and helicopter operations
Armoured Jägers, Mechanized Infantry units, trained in Armoured Brigade (Finland) and Karelia Brigade
Border Jägers, jägers trained in the Finnish Border Guard
Coastal Jaegers, marine commando unit of the Finnish Navy
Häme Mounted Jäger Battalion, previously Häme Cavalry Regiment, dismounted in 1944, disbanded in 2014.

The Netherlands
Garderegiment Grenadiers en Jagers, guards regiment, an amalgamation of the Garderegiment Grenadiers and the Garderegiment Jagers. Consists of one air mobile infantry battalion
Regiment Limburgse Jagers, line infantry (former 2nd Infantry Regiment). Consists of one armoured infantry battalion

Norway
Hærens Jegerkommando, the armed forces competence center for ranger, airborne and counter terrorist duty in the Norwegian Army
Jegerkompaniet, the Norwegian Army's northernmost unit
Kystjegerkommandoen, (Coastal Ranger Command) marine unit trained to operate in littoral combat theatres, filling the role of a marine corps and coastal artillery in the Norwegian Navy
Marinejegerkommandoen, a marine commando unit of the Norwegian Navy.
Artillerijeger, a ranger unit specialising in special reconnaissance and forward observing for artillery and aircraft. 
Grensejeger, border rangers at the border between Russia and Norway

(Imperial) Russia 
 His Majesty Lifeguard Jäger Regiment (Лейб-гвардии Егерский Его Величества полк)
 Yeger, ?including a Guard Grenadiers battalion

Sweden
Jägare are elite units in the Swedish Armed Forces
17th Air Force Ranger Company (Flygbasjägarna, FBJ), 
31st Ranger Battalion
32nd Intelligence Battalion
193rd Ranger Battalion (AJB)
202nd Coastal Ranger Company (Kustjägarna), marine commandos trained to operate in littoral combat theatres, filling the role of a marine corps and coastal artillery
323rd Parachute Ranger Squadron
Swedish Parachute Ranger School (FJS)

Defunct:
Lapland Ranger Regiment (I 22) (1975–2000) Arctic Ranger Battalion

United States
-The 24th Illinois Volunteer Infantry Regiment was also known as the "Hecker Jaeger Regiment" after Friedrich Hecker, its original commander.

-The Scout Sniper Platoon of Second Battalion, Third Marine Regiment is identified by the callsign "Jaeger".

See also 

 United States Army Rangers

References

Further reading
 
 
 

Jagers
Jaeger
Jager
Jager
Jagers
Jeger
 Jagare